Muzaffarnagar Assembly constituency is one of the 403 constituencies of the Uttar Pradesh Legislative Assembly, India. It is a part of the Muzaffarnagar district and one of the five assembly constituencies in the Muzaffarnagar Lok Sabha constituency. First election in this assembly constituency was held in 1951 after the "Delimitation Order" (DPACO-1951) was passed in 1951. In 2008, after the "Delimitation of Parliamentary and Assembly Constituencies Order, 2008" was passed, this constituency was assigned identification number 14.

Wards and areas
Extent of Muzaffarnagar Assembly constituency is PCs Bilaspur, Jatmunjhera, Makhiyali, Shernagar, Dhandhera, Bhandoora of Kukra KC & Muzaffarnagar NPP of Muzaffarnagar Tehsil.

Members of the Legislative Assembly

Election results

2022

2017

2007

See also

Government of Uttar Pradesh
Muzaffarnagar Lok Sabha constituency
List of Vidhan Sabha constituencies of Uttar Pradesh
Muzaffarnagar district
Sixteenth Legislative Assembly of Uttar Pradesh
Uttar Pradesh Legislative Assembly
Uttar Pradesh

References

External links
 

Assembly constituencies of Uttar Pradesh
Muzaffarnagar
Constituencies established in 1951
1951 establishments in Uttar Pradesh
Politics of Muzaffarnagar district